The Captiva 240 is an American trailerable sailboat that was first built in 1984. The boat is a development of the O.H. Rodgers-designed Rodgers 24 racer, modified for use as a racer-cruiser by Walter Scott by giving it a new keel and sailing rig.

Production
The design was built by Captiva Yachts of Clearwater, Florida, United States, from 1984 to 1988, with 140 boats completed, but it is now out of production. The hulls, decks and hull liners were fabricated under contract by Custom Fiberglass Products of Port Richey, Florida.

Design
The Captiva 240 is a recreational keelboat, built predominantly of fiberglass, with wooden trim. It has a fractional sloop rig with a deck-stepped mast, a raked stem, a slightly reverse transom a transom-hung rudder controlled by a tiller and a fixed stub keel, with a centerboard. It displaces  and carries  of ballast.

The boat is normally fitted with a small  outboard motor for docking and maneuvering.

The design has sleeping accommodation for five people, with a double "V"-berth in the bow cabin, a straight settee in the main cabin on the starboard side and a drop down table dinette, that can be converted to a double berth on the port side. The sliding, pull-out galley is located on the starboard side just forward of the companionway ladder. The galley is equipped with a stove and a sink. The head is a portable type and is located under the bow cabin "V"-berth on the port side.

The design is equipped with an anchor locker in the bow.

Operational history
In a 2010 review Steve Henkel wrote, "O.H. Rodgers originally designed this craft as an all-out racing machine called the Rodgers 24, and Walt Scott modified it with a slightly different keel and rig for duty as a performance cruiser for Captiva Yachts ... (which unfortunately closed its doors shortly after the vessel was introduced to the market). She's relatively light in weight, especially considering she is equipped with pull-out galley, dining table, head, and sleeping accommodations for five below, and anchor locker, bow and stern pulpits and lifelines on deck ... The average PHRF rating of 213 may keep her from winning as many races as she otherwise might. Or maybe it won't. If you find a well-kept example, check her racing record."

See also
List of sailing boat types

References

External links
Video tour of a Captiva 240
Photo of a Captiva 240
Photo of a Captiva 240

Keelboats
1980s sailboat type designs
Sailing yachts
Trailer sailers
Sailboat types built by Captiva Yachts
Sailboat types built by Sovereign Yachts
Sailboat type designs by American designers
Sailboat type designs by Walter Scott